The 1986 Colorado gubernatorial election was held on November 4, 1986. Democratic nominee Roy Romer defeated Republican nominee Ted L. Strickland with 58.20% of the vote.

Primary elections
Primary elections were held on August 12, 1986.

Democratic primary

Candidates
Roy Romer, Colorado State Treasurer

Results

Republican primary

Candidates
Ted L. Strickland, State Senator, and former Lieutenant Governor
Steve Schuck, businessman
Bob Kirscht, State Representative

Results

General election

Candidates
Major party candidates
Roy Romer, Democratic
Ted L. Strickland, Republican 

Other candidates
Earl F. Dodge Jr., Prohibition

Results

References

1986
Colorado
Gubernatorial